Clifton Geathers (born December 11, 1987) is a former American football defensive end in the National Football League for the Miami Dolphins, Seattle Seahawks, Dallas Cowboys, Indianapolis Colts, Philadelphia Eagles, Washington Redskins and Pittsburgh Steelers. He was drafted by the Cleveland Browns in the sixth round of the 2010 NFL Draft. He played college football at the University of South Carolina.

Early years
Geathers attended Carvers Bay High School. He enrolled at Hargrave Military Academy as a senior.

Although he originally intended to join the University of Georgia, he decomitted and accepted instead a football scholarship from the University of South Carolina. As a freshman, he was a backup defensive tackle, tallying 2 tackles in one game against South Carolina State University. He did not play in the season finale against Clemson University.

As a sophomore, he appeared in 13 games (one start) and recorded 29 tackles (17 solo). His first career start came against the University of Alabama at Birmingham, where he had  5 tackles (one for loss) and one quarterback hurry.

As a junior, he appeared in 12 games, posting 41 tackles (8.5 for loss), 3.5 sacks, 2 forced fumbles and one fumble recovery. He declared for the NFL draft before his senior season. He finished his college career with 36 games, 72 tackles (12 tackles for loss), 6 sacks, 2 forced fumbles and one fumble recovery.

Professional career

Cleveland Browns
Geathers was selected by the Cleveland Browns in the sixth round (186th overall) of the 2010 NFL draft. He was released on September 4.

Miami Dolphins
On September 5, 2010, Geathers was awarded to the Miami Dolphins on waiver claims. On November 26, he was waived to make room for Chris Baker.

Seattle Seahawks
On November 27, 2010, Geathers was claimed off waivers by the Seattle Seahawks. He was released on December 7.

Dallas Cowboys
On December 8, 2010, he was claimed off waivers by the Dallas Cowboys. He appeared in one game and was declared inactive for three others. 

In 2011, he played in five games as a backup defensive tackle, making 2 tackles and 3 quarterback pressures. He was released on August 31, 2012.

Indianapolis Colts
On October 3, 2012, Geathers was signed to the Indianapolis Colts practice squad. He would replace former Baylor nose tackle Nicolas Jean-Baptiste. He would spend 4 days total on Indianapolis' practice squad before being elevated to the active roster due to an injury to Colts' defensive end, Fili Moala. He recorded a sack against the Houston Texans on December 30. He had five tackles and his first career sack during the season.

Philadelphia Eagles

On March 28, 2013, the Philadelphia Eagles traded fullback Stanley Havili in exchange for Geathers. He played in 16 games for the first time in his career. He wasn't re-signed after the season.

Washington Redskins
On March 13, 2014, Geathers signed as an unrestricted free agent with the Washington Redskins. He appeared in six games and made 6 tackles. He was released on November 1, 2014.

Pittsburgh Steelers
On December 1, 2014, he signed a one-year contract with the Pittsburgh Steelers as a free agent, following an injury to Brett Keisel. He was a game-day inactive for each of the 5 (4 regular season and 1 postseason) games he was on the Steelers roster.

Geathers signed another one-year contract with the Steelers on April 1, 2015. On August 7, he was placed on season-ending injured reserve.

Personal life
His brother Robert Geathers Jr., was a defensive end for the Cincinnati Bengals. His uncle, Jumpy Geathers, played defensive end in the NFL. Clifton's father, Robert Geathers Sr., was a third-round pick in the 1981 NFL Draft, but an injury ended his career. His younger brother, Kwame Geathers,  played college football at The University of Georgia and was a nose tackle for the Cincinnati Bengals.  His cousin Clayton Geathers plays defensive back for the Indianapolis Colts.

References

External links

South Carolina Gamecocks bio

1987 births
Living people
American football defensive ends
American football defensive tackles
Dallas Cowboys players
Indianapolis Colts players
Miami Dolphins players
People from Georgetown, South Carolina
Philadelphia Eagles players
Pittsburgh Steelers players
Players of American football from South Carolina
Seattle Seahawks players
South Carolina Gamecocks football players
Washington Redskins players
Geathers family